Alix of Thouars (1200 – 21 October 1221) (in Breton Alis) ruled as Duchess of Brittany from 1203 until her death. She was also Countess of Richmond in the peerage of England.

Life 
Alix was born in 1200. She was the daughter of Constance, Duchess of Brittany and Guy of Thouars. According to several French historians, Constance died after giving birth to Alix's sisters Catherine and Margaret. Alix's older half-brother was Arthur I, Duke of Brittany and her half-sisters were Eleanor, Fair Maid of Brittany and Matilda of Brittany, the children of Constance and Geoffrey Plantagenet. Upon the death of Richard I of England, a power struggle commenced between her half-brother Arthur and John, King of England. At the Battle of Mirebeau in 1202, Arthur and Eleanor were captured. Arthur was imprisoned at the Château de Falaise and in 1203 disappeared. Eleanor was imprisoned at Corfe Castle.

The Breton barons recognized Alix as Duchess of Brittany after the presumed death of Arthur, instead of Eleanor. This was due to fears that John might claim to rule Brittany as regent for the imprisoned Eleanor. Alix's father Guy became regent for Alix until 1206, when Philip II of France made himself the regent of the duchy in Alix's name. King Philip II broke off the betrothal of Alix and the Breton prince Henry of Penthièvre,  and turned to his French cousin Peter of Dreux, as Alix's husband. In 1208, John permitted Eleanor to style herself Duchess of Brittany and Countess of Richmond. Pierre married Alix on 27 January 1213, and paid homage to the French king for Brittany. In 1214 John recognized Alix as Duchess of Brittany, renouncing the claim of Eleanor.

In 1218 Pierre and Alix were recognized by William Marshal, 1st Earl of Pembroke regent of England as Earl and Countess of Richmond in place of Eleanor, who would never be released from imprisonment.

Alix died on 21 October 1221, without having exercised much control over her own inheritance. She was succeeded in the duchy by her son John I, but Peter remained the de facto ruler of Brittany as John I's regent until 1237.

Children 
 John I, Duke of Brittany  (–1286), married Blanche of Navarre, daughter of the king of Navarre, Theobald I of Navarre.
 Yolande of Brittany, (1218–1272), married Hugh XI of Lusignan, Count of Angoulême and Count of Marche
 Arthur of Brittany (1220–1224), betrothed to Jeanne de Craon, daughter of Amaury I de Craon and Jeanne des Roches

Portrayals in literature 
Alix of Thouars is the heroine of the novel Le Poids d’une couronne (légende bretonne) (1867-1868) by Gabrielle d’Étampes and is mentioned in the novel Dans l’Ombre du Passé (2020) by Léa Chaillou, where it is revealed that the heroine is named after her.

Sources

References

Notes

See also

Dukes of Brittany family tree

1200 births
1221 deaths
12th-century Breton women
13th-century Breton women
13th-century dukes of Brittany
13th-century women rulers
Duchesses of Brittany
Medieval child monarchs
Deaths_in_childbirth
Dukes of Brittany